Vejce is a village in the municipality of Tetovo, North Macedonia. It is a small village located in the Šar Mountains, some 9.01 kilometres away from the closest city Tetovo and 1250 metres above sea level.

History

During the insurgency in the Republic of Macedonia, on the way between Selce and Vejce, rebels of the paramilitary Albanian UÇK ambushed the Macedonian armed forces.

Demographics
According to the 2021 census, the village had a total of 848 inhabitants. Ethnic groups in the village include:

Albanians 804
Macedonians 2
Others 42

References

External links

Šar Mountains
Villages in Tetovo Municipality
Albanian communities in North Macedonia